Patricia Roush is an American activist who has pioneered the issue of international child abduction and has been at the forefront of this issue as it relates to Saudi Arabia.

Background
Roush's own daughters, Alia and Aisha, were kidnapped by their non-custodial Saudi father and were never returned to the United States. Now grown, they remain in Saudi Arabia due to its ban on women traveling without a male guardian's permission. Reportedly, they are now both married as a result of arranged marriages and have children of their own.

She has testified to the United States Congress to advocate more be done to repatriate kidnapped children.

She has sought help from the U.S. government, and believes it has largely let her down; however, she cites former Saudi Ambassador Ray Mabus and U.S. Rep. Dan Burton (R-CA) as individuals who were particularly supportive. She wrote At Any Price, detailing her experiences with the Saudi government.

See also
 Hague Convention on the Civil Aspects of International Child Abduction
 International child abduction in the United States
 Not Without My Daughter

References

Saudi Arabia–United States relations
Year of birth missing (living people)
Living people
American activists